Evangel Christian School may refer to several schools in the United States:

 Evangel Christian School — Lakeland, Florida — see Carpenter's Home Church#Evangel Christian School
 Evangel Christian School (Alabama) — Alabaster, Alabama (www.evangelhomeschool.org)]
 Evangel Christian School (Kentucky) — Louisville, Kentucky
 Evangel Christian School (New York) — Long Island City, New York
 Evangel Christian School (South Carolina) — Charleston, South Carolina
 Evangel Christian School (Colonial Heights, Virginia) — Colonial Heights, Virginia
 Evangel Christian School (Woodbridge, Virginia) — Woodbridge, Virginia
 Evangel Christian Academy — Montgomery, Alabama
 Evangel Christian Academy — Shreveport, Louisiana
 Evangel Christian Academy — Albuquerque, New Mexico
 Evangel Christian Academy — Gahanna, Ohio
 Evangel Baptist Academy — Bucksport, Maine
 Evangel Heights Christian Academy — Sarver, Pennsylvania
 Evangel Temple Christian Academy — Morrow, Georgia
 Evangel Temple Christian School — Grand Prairie, Texas
 Evangel Temple Christian Acada School — Lucedale, Mississippi